Osman Duraliev (15 January 1939 – 25 April 2011) was a Bulgarian freestyle wrestler with Turkish origin. Between 1967 and 1972 he won ten silver medals at major international competitions, including the 1968 and 1972 Summer Olympics. An archrival of the Soviet Aleksandr Medved, to whom he lost eight high-profile finals (two Olympic, four World, and two European,) subsequently winning only the Silver medals. He came close to winning at the 1971 World Championships in Sofia, where he led the match 4:3 with 43 seconds left. Yet Medved equalized the score and won the title because of his lower body weight. Considering that Medved was named one of the greatest wrestlers in history, the Duraliev could be deservedly placed in the same rostrum with Medved and a select few others.

In 1989 Duraliev immigrated to Turkey, where he died aged 72.

References

External links
 

1939 births
2011 deaths
People from Razgrad
Bulgarian people of Turkish descent
Olympic wrestlers of Bulgaria
Wrestlers at the 1968 Summer Olympics
Wrestlers at the 1972 Summer Olympics
Bulgarian male sport wrestlers
Olympic silver medalists for Bulgaria
Olympic medalists in wrestling
Bulgarian Turks in Turkey
Bulgarian emigrants to Turkey
World Wrestling Championships medalists
Medalists at the 1972 Summer Olympics
Medalists at the 1968 Summer Olympics
European Wrestling Championships medalists